The Communist Party of Nepal is a name used by a number of Nepalese political parties claiming allegiance to communism. Most trace their roots back to the original Communist Party of Nepal formed in 1949.

Active parties

National parties

Other parliamentary parties

Minor parties

Defunct parties

References

Communist